The Orlando Titans were a professional lacrosse team in the National Lacrosse League that played in the 2010 season. The Titans began as the New York Titans, and played for three seasons in New York before announcing the move to Orlando on August 10, 2009.

They played their first official game on January 8, 2010, versus the Philadelphia Wings. The Titans won 13–8.

In July 2010, the web site NLL Insider reported that the Titans would not participate in the 2011 season due to financial difficulties.  Reportedly, several Titans players were applying to the league for free agency, based on non-payment of salary; any players not granted free agency will be dispersed to the other teams via a dispersal draft. In September 2010, it was reported in the Orlando Business Journal that the 2011 season had completely been canceled and that calls were placed to all season ticket holders to inform them. The Orlando Business Journal notes that the Titans' website has been taken down, phone lines have been disconnected, and no sources close to the team (along with the league itself) were aware of the shutdown; most fans are unlikely to receive a refund from the team.

Awards and honors

All-time record

Playoff results

Draft history

NLL Entry Draft 
First Round Selections

 2009: None
 2010: None

References 

Lacrosse clubs established in 2009
Sports competitions in Orlando, Florida
Lacrosse teams in Florida
Defunct National Lacrosse League teams
2009 establishments in Florida
2010 disestablishments in Florida
Sports clubs disestablished in 2010